Nanaimo—Cowichan is a former federal electoral district in British Columbia, Canada, which was represented in the House of Commons of Canada between 1988 and 2015. It was located on Vancouver Island.

Demographics

Geography
It included, together with more rural areas, the southern portion of the City of Nanaimo, the City of Duncan, the Town of Ladysmith, and the District of North Cowichan.

History
The electoral district was created in 1987 from parts of Nanaimo–Alberni and Cowichan—Malahat—The Islands ridings.

The 2012 electoral redistribution saw this riding dissolved into the new ridings of Cowichan—Malahat—Langford and Nanaimo—Ladysmith for the 2015 election.

Members of Parliament

This riding has elected the following Members of Parliament:

Election results

See also
 List of Canadian federal electoral districts
 Past Canadian electoral districts

References

 National Post article on Canadian troops
 Library of Parliament Riding Profile
 Campaign expense data from Elections Canada – 2008
 Expenditures - 2004
 Expenditures – 2000
 Expenditures – 1997

Notes

External links
 Website of the Parliament of Canada
 Map of Nanaimo—Cowichan riding archived by Elections Canada
 Imagine the Cowichan, part of Simon Fraser University's Imagine BC series

Defunct British Columbia federal electoral districts on Vancouver Island
Duncan, British Columbia
Politics of Nanaimo